Morten Gladhaug Berre (born 10 August 1975) is a Norwegian football coach and former player who played as. a winger. With 447 top division appearances, Berre has made the second-highest number of appearances in the Norwegian top division.

Club career
Berre was born in Oslo and started his career at Skeid. He is best known for his spell at Vålerenga, where he stayed for 13 seasons. Berre also played for FK Haugesund and Viking as well as for German club FC St. Pauli. Whilst at Viking he scored one of the goals as they famously defeated Chelsea in the UEFA Cup in 2002.

International career
Berre was capped once for the Norwegay national team.

Career statistics

Honours
Viking
Norwegian Cup: 2001

Vålerenga
Norwegian top division: 2005
Norwegian Cup: 2008

References

External links
 Profile at Valerenga 
 

1975 births
Living people
Footballers from Oslo
Norwegian footballers
Association football midfielders
Association football forwards
Norway international footballers
Skeid Fotball players
FK Haugesund players
Viking FK players
FC St. Pauli players
Vålerenga Fotball players
Eliteserien players
Norwegian Second Division players
Bundesliga players
Norwegian expatriate footballers
Norwegian expatriate sportspeople in Germany
Expatriate footballers in Germany